Guangzhou Automobile Group Co., Ltd. (GAC Group) is a Chinese state-owned automobile manufacturer headquartered in Guangzhou, Guangdong. Founded in 1954, it is currently the fifth largest automobile manufacturer in China, with 2.144 million sales in 2021.

The company produces and sells vehicles under its own branding, such as Trumpchi, Aion, Hycan as well as under foreign-branded joint ventures such as GAC-Toyota, GAC-Honda, and GAC-Mitsubishi. It also produces electric vehicles under some of the previously listed brandings, including dedicated EV brands such as Aion and Hycan. It produces buses under the GAC Bus brand. Other brand names associated with GAC are Everus, for consumer vehicles, and Hino.

In 2021, it was the fourth largest Chinese plug-in electric vehicle manufacturer in the Chinese market, with 4% of market share. It sold 123,660 units of EVs in 2021, and over 20,000 units in March 2022, with plans to double EV production capacity to 400,000 a year by December 2022.

History
Guangzhou Automobile Group Co., Ltd. was founded in 1955, and in 2005 become a holding of Guangzhou Automobile Industry Group and a joint-stock company. As of 2009 it was the 6th-largest automaker in China.

In 2009, the company acquired 29% of the Chinese sport-utility vehicle maker Changfeng Automobile, becoming its biggest shareholder. GAC purchased the remaining portion of Changfeng in 2011 completing its acquisition of the company.

Previously a backdoor listing via Denway Motors, GAC became listed under its own name on the Stock Exchange of Hong Kong in 2010. In that year shareholders of Denway Motors approved its privatization by GAC. Denway Motors was subsequently delisted on 25 August 2010 and replaced by Guangzhou Automobile Group on 30 August 2010 via stock swap.

In late 2010 GAC purchased 51% ownership of Gonow, a midsize Chinese automaker of sport-utility vehicles, subcompacts, and pickup trucks.

In December 2010 GAC launched the new Trumpchi marque. Its initial product was based on the Alfa Romeo 166.

In 2010 GAC was among the ten largest Chinese carmakers reaching number six and selling 724,200 vehicles.
 
2011 saw the company retain its position as the sixth-largest Chinese automaker by production volume, with GAC making 740,400 vehicles in that year.

In early 2012, the company was listed on the Shanghai Stock exchange.

Owned brands

Trumpchi

Trumpchi is an automotive marque owned by GAC Group and launched in December 2010.

Aion

GAC New Energy Automobile Co is the NEV arm of GAC. GAC New Energy produces their own EV brand, Aion.

Hycan

Hycan is a brand by GAC-NIO New Energy Technology Co., Ltd., a joint venture between Chinese automobile manufacturers GAC Group and Nio Inc., founded in April 2019 to produce electric vehicles. In early 2021, GAC took a controlling stake in the company, diluting Nio's share to 4.5%.

Changfeng Motor (Leopaard) (discontinued)

In 2009, GAC owned 29% ownership of this SUV-maker a purchase supposedly imposed by the Chinese state as a condition of a then-upcoming joint venture with Fiat. GAC completed its acquisition of Changfeng in 2011. In 2012 Changfeng Group began moves to re-enter the vehicle business culminating in the move to a new headquarters in Changsha in January 2013 and the establishment of a new subsidiary, Hunan Liebao Automobile Co. Ltd., alongside the continuing Anhui Changfeng Yangzi Automobile Manufacturing Co., Ltd., to oversea manufacturing and marketing of vehicles under the Liebao or "Leopaard" brand.

Gonow (discontinued)

Gonow (officially Zhejiang Gonow Auto Co., Ltd.) is a Chinese manufacturer of automobiles, commercial vehicles and SUV's headquartered in Taizhou, Zhejiang and a subsidiary of GAC Group. It markets its products under the brand name GAC Gonow in China and as Gonow in other markets.

Joint venture brands

GAC Honda

Guangqi Honda is a 50:50 joint venture between GAC and Honda, which has been making a number of Honda and Acura-branded vehicles for the Chinese market since 1999. It started sales of its own brand, Everus in 2011.

GAC Wuyang-Honda 
Wuyang-Honda markets Honda Motorcycles for the Chinese market.

GAC Mitsubishi

GAC Mitsubishi Motors is a joint venture between GAC and the Japanese automaker Mitsubishi Motors. It became operational in September 2012 following a late 2010 memorandum of understanding.

GAC Toyota

GAC Toyota Motor Co., Ltd. is a 50:50 joint venture between GAC and Toyota Motor Company which manufactures Toyota vehicles for the Chinese market. It was founded in 2004 and is headquartered in Guangzhou.

GAC Hino 

GAC Hino is a joint venture between Hino and GAC aimed at producing Hino-based trucks.

GAC BYD 
GAC BYD is a joint venture between GAC (49%) and BYD (51%) to produce BYD-designed busses under GAC's brand name.

Former joint ventures

Guangzhou Isuzu
Guangzhou Isuzu Bus Co., Ltd. was a coach manufacturing joint venture between GAC (51%), Isuzu Motors (33.67%) and Isuzu (China) Investment Co., Ltd. (15.33%) that was established on 6 March 2000. Isuzu light trucks and buses were also built by Guangzhou Yangcheng Automobile, a joint venture with Hong Kong China Lounge Logistics. Their light trucks are based on the Isuzu Elf and are marketed under the "YCACO" brand. Yangcheng's various bus building operations were merged with Guangzhou Isuzu Bus and Denway into the Guangzhou Bus Co., Ltd. in September 2008. At the same time, Guangzhou Yangcheng's truck making arm was merged into Guangzhou Hino.

Guangzhou Peugeot

One of the first Sino-western joint venture auto-making companies, Guangzhou Peugeot Automobile Co. Ltd. was a joint venture set up by PSA Peugeot Citroën and the Guangzhou Municipal government between 1985 and 1997. Over its eleven-year lifespan, the company produced about 100,000 cars.

Sales began in 1989 mainly as automobiles for government officials and taxis. Its model line comprised the Peugeot 505 and 504.

GAC Stellantis/Fiat Chrysler

Fiat signed on to a joint venture with GAC on 6 July 2009, and GAC FIAT Automobiles Co Ltd was incorporated on 9 March 2010. The new company has a production base in Changsha, Hunan Province, that opened on 28 June 2012 to manufacture the Dodge Dart-based Fiat Viaggio.

Sales

International operations 
GAC Group has been repeatedly vocal about plans to introduce models to the United States.

Trumpchi made its first appearance at the North American International Auto Show in Detroit in January 2013, where the Trumpchi E-Jet concept made its world debut. In 2017, the company returned and showed three SUVs and two sedans. In January 2018, Trumpchi brought five new models and a concept SUV, the Enverge. GAC established research and development teams in Silicon Valley and Los Angeles in 2017 and 2018, respectively.

On 15 May 2015, GAC Group launched a ceremony to celebrate the opening of its Lebanese office under 
Bazerji Motors SAL. On 29 May 2015, GAC Group partnered with Doha Marketing and Services Company (DOMASCO), to market and sell their vehicles to the local customers in the Middle East.

During the 2019 Detroit Auto Show they announced delays to their sales plans to the first half of 2020.

On 22 May 2019, an indefinite postponement of their US market plans was announced due to the China–U.S. trade war.

On 20 November 2020, GAC Group established a branch in Chile.

Sponsorships 
GAC was the sponsor of the 2011 World Table Tennis Championships held in Rotterdam and the title sponsor of the 2012 ITTF World Tour.

GAC was the title sponsor of the 2013 World Team Cup Table Tennis tournament held in its home city of Guangzhou.

References

External links
GAC official site

 
Companies formerly in the Hang Seng China Enterprises Index
Companies listed on the Hong Kong Stock Exchange
Companies listed on the Shanghai Stock Exchange
Vehicle manufacturing companies established in 1955
Government-owned companies of China
Car manufacturers of China
Electric vehicle manufacturers of China
H shares
Chinese companies established in 1955
Chinese brands
Bus manufacturers of China
Truck manufacturers of China